Public Eye is a British television drama series that ran from 1965 to 1975, a total of 87 episodes were produced over a run of seven series over the course of ten years. The first three series were produced by ABC Television, and the remaining four series were produced by Thames Television. The series was created by Roger Marshall and Anthony Marriott, and it deals with an enquiry agent Frank Marker (Alfred Burke) who handles various cases and investigations through the course of the series.

Series 1 (1965) 
The first series was set in London, and premiered on ABC Television on the 23 January 1965; although at the time the series was not given a network broadcast across the ITV Network, since at the time the regional companies were given the freedom to broadcast programmes at different dates or choose not to take up the show at all. Only Southern Television and Ulster Television broadcast this series at the same time as ABC, this series was broadcast later the same year by Associated Television, Border, Channel, Grampian, Scottish Television, Tyne Tees, TWW and Westward, though this series was not broadcast in its entirerity by TWW, and not taken up by Anglia. At fifteen episodes long the series has the longest run of the seven series that were produced, though due to the archival policies at the time many of the episodes from this series were junked or lost, and today only two episodes are currently known to survive in the archives. Initially the episode "The Morning Wasn't So Hot" was slated to be the opening episode, but in the end ABC replaced with "All For a Couple of Ponies" instead, and the former episode was broadcast later on in the series.

Series 2 (1966) 
For the second series, the setting changed to Birmingham as Marker is forced to move operations out of London after getting involved with some influential people. This change in location was in part motivated by ABC's drive to produce more of their shows in the Midlands, at their studios in Aston, near Birmingham. Only Ulster simultaneously broadcast this series at the same time as ABC, other ITV companies such as Anglia, Border, Grampian, Rediffusion, Southern and Tyne Tees transmitted the series a day earlier, while Channel, Scottish Television, TWW and Westward started transmitting the series later the same month. Though TWW only transmitted nine episodes in total. This series is slightly shorter than the previous, a total of thirteen episodes were produced. Likewise with the previous series, only two episodes are currently known to survive from this series, although audio recordings for the last five episodes have been recovered.

Series 3 (1968) 
The third and final series to be produced by ABC Television, prior to the company losing their weekend franchise in July 1968 following the franchise review called on by the ITA on the 12 June 1967. This was the last series not be networked across the ITV regional companies. This series was broadcast later the same year by Border, Grampian, Scottish Television, Southern, Tyne Tees and Ulster, though the series was not taken up by Anglia, Channel, Westward and TWW. This series has the worst survival rate out of all seven series, only one episode "The Bromsgrove Venus" is known to survive in the archives. A further 5 minute fragment from another episode "It Must Be the Architecture - Can't Be the Climate" was recovered from a Umatic recording of an ABC Promotional Reel produced at the time. It was also the second and last series to be set in Birmingham, and also the last to be broadcast on a Saturday, a practice that had been maintained for the past three series.

Series 4 (1969) 
The first series to be produced by Thames Television following the franchise review in 1967 where ABC lost their licence for weekend broadcasting, and had merged with Rediffusion to form Thames. At seven episodes long, this series had the shortest run of the show's tenure. This series was also the first to be fully networked across the ITV regions, and the first series to have all its episode survive in the archives. The series marks a change in tone after two series set in Birmingham; following on from Frank's arrest and sentencing to prison at the end of the previous series, he is released on probation and attempts to rebuild his life by relocating to Brighton. Each episode was written by co-creator Roger Marshall and constructed as a seven part serial. In the run up to the commencement of colour broadcasting on both BBC1 and ITV in November 1969, the final episode of the series, "A Fixed Address" was taped in colour, although the episode still used the same monochrome title sequence from that series and was also broadcast in monochrome. This series also saw the introduction of semi-regular supporting characters, which was a feature absent up to this point in the show's run. This series introduced Marker's landlady Helen Mortimer (Pauline Delaney) who would appear in almost every episode in this series and would appear on a semi regular basis on subsequent series. John Grieve also regularly appeared through this series as his probabtion officer Jim Hull. Up to now the series had been broadcast on Saturday, but with the show now being produced by Thames whose licence only extended to weekday broadcasting, the transmission day was switched to Wednesday, and it would remain this way until the end of Series 6.

Series 5 (1971) 
For the fifth series, the setting changed again to Eton and the surrounding Windsor area, it would remain as the primary setting until early on in Series 7. At thirteen episodes long, this series was double the length from the previous series, and this format would remain this way for the remainder of the show's tenure. Filming on the series commenced in late November 1970, a few weeks after the ITV Colour Strike commenced when technicians went on strike after demanding higher wages for using the new colour studio equipment, and subsequently five episodes from this series were taped in monochrome. The first episode to be taped in colour was "I Always Wanted a Swimming Pool" in March 1971, a few weeks after the strike had ended. Due to the series being shot out of sequence, the monochrome episodes were changed around for broadcast and were not transmitted together. This series also marked the only one without any episodes written by series co-creator Roger Marshall. This series also saw the introduction of DS Percy Firbank (Ray Smith) who keeps a close eye on Marker after he sets up business in the area, over time they would establish a friendship and assist each other on cases, he would become the series longest running supporting character, making a total of fourteen appearances over three series . Nell Holdsworth (Brenda Cavendish) also made frequent appearances through this series.

Series 6 (1972-3) 
The sixth series and the first to be taped entirely in colour. This series was beset by a couple of broadcast delays, the transmission date for episode three "Many a Slip" was delayed by a week due to Boxing coverage of the bout between Muhammad Ali vs. Bob Foster from the previous day, and it also faced a mid series delay when episode seven "A Family Affair" was postponed by a week, as there was no broadcast scheduled immediately after Christmas. This was also the second and last series to wholly be set in Eton, since the setting would change early on in the following series. It was also the last series to be broadcast on a Wednesday, a practise that had been maintained since Series 4.

Series 7 (1975) 
For the seventh and final series, the setting changed several times, moving from Eton to Walton, and ultimately to Chertsey midway during the series.  This series operated around three loose story arcs as Marker moved onto another location, and as a result it also saw the departure of long running supporting character DS Percy Firbank when Marker relocates to Walton in the episode "How About It Frank?". In the same episode Ron Gash (Peter Childs) makes his first appearance, a former policeman and friend of Percy's, who runs a private investigation agency in the area and offers Frank a job with his agency at the end of the episode. Scheduling of this series was switched to Monday, and the transmission date for the last episode of the series "Unlucky For Some" was delayed for a week, due to it being postponed over Easter. Due to the series being produced out of sequence, the last episode that was produced and taped was "How About it Frank?" in late November 1974.

References

External links 
 Public Eye (TV Series)
 Public Eye at IMDb
 Public Eye: Frank Marker Investigates
 Web Archive - Public Eye Episode Guide
 BFI Screenonline - Public Eye (1965-75)
 Nostalgia Central - Public Eye

Public Eye